Rhyscotus rotundatus is a species of armadillo woodlice, a terrestrial crustacean isopod of the family Rhyscotidae. It is endemic to the island of São Tomé in São Tomé and Príncipe. The species was described in 1978 by Helmut Schmalfuss and Franco Ferrara.

References

Further reading
 Schmalfuss, H. 2003. World catalog of terrestrial isopods (Isopoda: Oniscidea). Stuttgarter Beiträge zur Naturkunde, Serie A Nr. 654: 341 pp.

Woodlice
Endemic fauna of São Tomé Island
Invertebrates of São Tomé and Príncipe
Crustaceans described in 1978